The Whole Booke of Psalmes Faithfully Translated into English Metre, commonly called the Bay Psalm Book, is a metrical psalter first printed in 1640 in Cambridge, Massachusetts. It was the first book printed in British North America. The psalms in it are metrical translations into English. The translations are not particularly polished, and none have remained in use, although some of the tunes to which they were sung have survived (for instance, "Old 100th"); however, its production, just 20 years after the Pilgrims' arrival at Plymouth, Massachusetts, represents a considerable achievement. It went through several editions and remained in use for well over a century. 

In November 2013, one of eleven known surviving copies of the first edition sold at auction for $14.2 million, a record for a printed book.

History

17th century 
The early residents of the Massachusetts Bay Colony brought with them several books of psalms: the Ainsworth Psalter (1612), compiled by Henry Ainsworth for use by Puritan "separatists" in Holland; the Ravenscroft Psalter (1621); and the Sternhold and Hopkins Psalter (1562), of which there were several editions. Evidently they were dissatisfied with the translations from Hebrew in these several psalters and wished for some that were closer to the original. They hired "thirty pious and learned Ministers", including Richard Mather, Thomas Mayhew, and John Eliot, to undertake a new translation, which they presented here. The tunes to be sung to the new translations were the familiar ones from their existing psalters.

The first printing was the third product of the Stephen Day (sometimes spelled Daye) press, and consisted of a 148 small quarto leaves, including a 12-page preface, "The Psalmes in Metre", "An Admonition to the Reader", and an extensive list of errata headed "Faults escaped in printing". As with subsequent editions of the book, Day printed the book for sale by the first bookseller in British America, Hezekiah Usher, whose shop at that time was also located in Cambridge, Massachusetts. An estimated 1,700 copies of the first edition were printed.

The third edition (1651) was extensively revised by Henry Dunster and Richard Lyon. The revision was entitled The Psalms, hymns and spiritual songs of the Old and New Testament, faithfully translated into English metre. This revision was the basis for all subsequent editions, and was popularly known as the New England Psalter or New England Version. The ninth edition (1698), the first to contain music, included 13 tunes from John Playford's A Breefe Introduction to the Skill of Musick (London, 1654).

18th century 
The expansion of the neoclassical movement in England led to an evolution in the singing of psalms. These changes found their way to America and subsequently new psalm versions were written. In the early part of the 18th century several updated psalms, notably those written by Tate and Brady and by Isaac Watts, were published. Shortly thereafter several congregations in New England elected to replace the Bay Psalm Book with these new titles.

In 1718, Cotton Mather undertook the revision of the original Bay Psalm Book which he had studied since youth. Two subsequent revisions were published in 1752, by John Barnard of Marblehead and in 1758 by Thomas Prince. Prince was a clergyman at the Old South Church in Boston. He convinced the members of the congregation of the need to produce a revised, more scholarly, edition of the Bay Psalm Book. Unfortunately, Prince's version was not accepted outside of his membership and in 1789, the Old South Church reverted to the earlier edition published by Isaac Watts.

Title page
The title page of the first edition of 1640 reads:

An example of the text
"Psalm 23" provides an example of the translation, style and versification of the text of the Bay Psalm Book:

Extant copies and auction records

Eleven copies of the first edition of the Bay Psalm Book are still known to exist,  of which only five copies are complete. Only one of the eleven copies is currently held outside the United States. One copy is owned by each of the following:

A 1648 edition, described in American Book Prices Current as the "Emerson Copy", fetched $15,000 on May 3, 1983, at New England Book Auctions in South Deerfield, Massachusetts. On September 17, 2009, Swann Galleries auctioned an early edition, c. 1669–1682, bound with an Edinburgh Bible, for $57,600.

See also
 Codex Leicester, which holds the record for the sale price of any book
 House of the First Print Shop in the Americas
 John Ratcliff
 Metrical psalter
 List of most expensive books and manuscripts

Notes

External links

 Fully digitized copy of the original 1640 edition from the John Carter Brown Library collection available at the World Digital Library
 Arch. G e.40 Digital facsimile from the Bodleian Library
 Bay Psalm Book From the American Imprint Collection at the Library of Congress
 The preface to the book
 Reprint of the First Edition
 Historic Boston Church’s Decision to Sell Rare Psalmbook Divides Congregation

1640 books
1640 in the Thirteen Colonies
1640 in Massachusetts
Calvinist texts
History of Cambridge, Massachusetts
Psalters
New England Puritanism
History of mass media